A balcony (from , "scaffold") is a platform projecting from the wall of a building, supported by columns or console brackets, and enclosed with a balustrade, usually above the ground floor.

Types
The traditional Maltese balcony is a wooden closed balcony projecting from a wall.

By contrast, a Juliet balcony does not protrude out of the building. It is usually part of an upper floor, with a balustrade only at the front, like a small loggia. A modern Juliet balcony often involves a metal barrier placed in front of a high window that can be opened. In the UK, the technical name for one of these was officially changed in August 2020 to a Juliet guarding.

Juliet balconies are named after William Shakespeare's Juliet, who, in traditional stagings of the play Romeo and Juliet, is courted by Romeo while she is on her balcony—though the play itself, as written, makes no mention of a balcony, but only of a window at which Juliet appears. Various types of balcony have been used in depicting this famous scene; however the 'balcony of Juliet' at Villa Capuleti in Verona is not a 'Juliet balcony', as it does indeed protrude from the wall of the villa (see photograph below).

Functions
A unit with a regular balcony will have doors that open onto a small patio with railings, a small patio garden or skyrise greenery. A French balcony is a false balcony, with doors that open to a railing with a view of the courtyard or the surrounding scenery below.

Sometimes balconies are adapted for ceremonial purposes, e.g. that of St. Peter's Basilica at Rome, when the newly elected pope gives his blessing urbi et orbi after the conclave. Inside churches, balconies are sometimes provided for the singers, and in banqueting halls and the like for the musicians.

In theatres, the balcony was formerly a stage-box, but the name is now usually confined to the part of the auditorium above the dress circle and below the gallery.

Balconies are part of the sculptural shape of the building allowing for irregular facades without the cost of irregular internal structures.

In addition to functioning as an outdoor space for a dwelling unit, balconies can also play a secondary role in building sustainability and indoor environmental quality (IEQ). Balconies have been shown to provide an overhang effect that helps prevent interior overheating by reducing solar gain, and may also have benefits in terms of blocking noise and improving natural ventilation within units.

Materials 
Balconies can be made out of various materials, however the most popular used to be stone. With the rise of technology and the modern age, balconies are now able to be built out of other materials, including glass and stainless steel to provide a durable and modern look to a building.

Notable balconies
One of the most famous uses of a balcony is in traditional stagings of the scene that has come to be known as the "balcony scene" in Shakespeare's tragedy Romeo and Juliet (though the scene makes no mention of a balcony, only of a window at which Juliet appears).

Balcony names
Manufacturers' names for their balcony railing designs often refer to the origin of the design, e.g. Italian balcony, Spanish balcony, Mexican balcony, Ecuadorian balcony. They also refer to the shape and form of the pickets used for the balcony railings, e.g. knuckle balcony. Within the construction industry it is normal for balconies to be named descriptively. For example, slide-on cassette balconies referring to the modern method used to install aluminium balconies or cast-insitu balconies relating to concrete balconies poured on a construction site.

Gallery

See also

Notes

References

External links

Architectural elements
Garden features
Floors
Parts of a theatre

ta:பலுக்கல்